Kleinia amaniensis is a species of flowering plant in the genus Kleinia and the family Asteraceae.

References

External links

amaniensis
Plants described in 1910
Taxa named by Alwin Berger